Jokshan (yoqšān). According to the Bible he was a son of Abraham (Avraham) and his wife or concubine Keturah, whom he wed after the death of Sarah. Jokshan had five brothers: Zimran, Medan, Midian, Ishbak and Shuah; as well as two half brothers: Ishmael (Ismail) and Isaac (Ishaq). He was Keturah's second son and Abraham's fourth.

Josephus records that "Abraham contrived to settle them in colonies; and they took possession of Troglodytis and the country of Arabia Felix, as far as it reaches to the Red Sea."

Jokshan became the father of Sheba and Dedan. Dedan had three sons, named Asshurim, Letushim, and Leummim.

In his "History of the Prophets and Kings", Tabari says that the wife of the North Arabian ancestor Adnan, Mahdad bint Laham, was a descendant of Jokshan (Yaqshan).

References

Children of Abraham